The High Court of Admiralty Act 1859 (22 & 23 Vict., c. 6) was an Act of Parliament passed by the Parliament of the United Kingdom. The Act was an important step in moving the ancient Admiralty Court of England and Wales towards its modern constitution. It was also an important step in the abolition of Doctors' Commons.

Background
English Admiralty law is based not on the common law but on civil law, though with some common law and statutory developments. As such, it was historically administered, not by the practitioners in the common law courts but by the practitioners in the ecclesiastical courts, who were organised in the Doctors' Commons and called "advocates" and "proctors," rather than barristers and solicitors. This demarcation was widely held to be restrictive and by the middle of the nineteenth century there was pressure for reform, culminating in the Court of Probate Act 1857 which started the process of abolition of Doctors' Commons which was completed in 1865.

The Act and its effect
The Act received its royal assent on 8 August 1859.

The long title of the Act was:

By allowing the common lawyers to practise in the Admiralty court, the civil lawyers were deprived of one of their few remaining privileges, thus hastening the demise of their separate constitution.

References

Bibliography

United Kingdom Acts of Parliament 1859
Legal history of England
English admiralty law
1859 in England